Carlos Efrén Reyes Rosado (born May 2, 1991), better known by his stage name Farruko, is a Puerto Rican rapper and singer. He rose to fame collaborating with Daddy Yankee, J Balvin, Don Omar, and J Álvarez. He came to prominence in 2010 with his first solo album, El Talento del Bloque.

Career

2007–2011: Career beginnings 
Farruko began his career in 2009. He credits Myspace with helping him create a fan base that would eventually result in him becoming a popular singer. In 2011, Farruko appears on a song with José Feliciano called "Su Hija Me Gusta". As his style developed he typically directed his music to younger people and relationships. As his songs grew in popularity online, Puerto Rican radio stations picked up on the internet hype and began to broadcast Farruko to a wider audience, solidifying his presence in the reggaeton scene.

2012–2022: Early music 
Farruko was nominated for the Latin Grammy Award for Best Urban Music Album in 2012. In the summer of 2014, Farruko's hit songs, "Passion Whine" and "6 AM", both with  J Balvin, "6 AM" changed Farruko's career for the best, both songs reached spots 1 and 2, respectively."Passion Whine" ranked on the Top Latin Songs list, published by Monitor Latino, for 26 consecutive weeks. The song "6 AM"  earned Farruko nominations at Premios Juventud for Best Urban Fusion/Performance for "6 AM" and Best Urban Song at the 15th Annual Latin Grammy Awards.

He has been the lead singer or featured on top performing songs including "Krippy Kush", "Inolvidable", "Quiéreme", and "Calma" (remix). Farruko has collaborated with many artists including Bad Bunny, J Balvin, Nicki Minaj, Travis Scott, Ricky Martin, and Wisin & Yandel.

In 2014, Farruko and his manager, Franklin Martínez, cofounded the music label, Carbon Fiber Music, which as of 2022 has 9 artists signed to the music label. 

On June 24, 2021, Farruko released his hit single "Pepas", which has more than 1 billion streams on Spotify. The song is a mixture of tribal guarachero and reggaeton.

On February 12, 2022, during a performance at the FTX Arena in Miami, Farruko stopped the concert to give a speech, in which he devoted himself to preaching about God, expressing his problems and asking forgiveness for the lyrics of some of his songs. Responding to complaint of fans, Farruko replied that "Farru is retired and Carlos is here now" and that they will refund the money of dissatisfied attendees.  However, Farruko did not actually retire and is scheduled to resume performing in May 2023.

Arrest 
On April 3, 2018, Farruko was arrested in Puerto Rico, accused of hiding $52,000 in undeclared cash in shoes and luggage when returning from the Dominican Republic for which he was required to do three years of probation. As of 2017, he had a net worth of $3 million.

Tours 
 2010–2011: El Talento del Bloque Tour
 2012: TMPR Tour
 2013: El Imperio Nazza: Farruko Edition Tour
 2015: Los Menores Tour Bus
 2016: Visionary World Tour
 2017: TrapXFicante Tour
 2019: Gangalee Tour

Discography

Studio albums 
 El Talento del Bloque (2010)
 The Most Powerful Rookie (2012)
 Farruko Presenta: Los Menores (2014)
 Visionary (2015)
 TrapXFicante (2017)
 Gangalee (2019)
 En Letra de Otro (2019)
 La 167 (2021)

Awards and nominations

References

External links 
 
 

1991 births
Living people
People from Bayamón, Puerto Rico
21st-century Puerto Rican male singers
Puerto Rican reggaeton musicians
Urbano musicians
Latin trap musicians
Universal Music Latino artists
Sony Music Latin artists
Latin music songwriters